Don Vincent Godden (born 13 November 1936 - 28 May 2011) was a Motorcycle rider who competed in Longtrack and Grasstrack Racing. He competed in twelve World Longtrack Championship Finals and won the title in 1969. Don's son Mitchel is also a successful Longtrack and Grasstrack racer, as is his grandson Cameron.

Don was very much a Motorcycle racing pioneer, not only was he the first to compete regularly on the continent but was also a successful Motorcycle Racing engineer. He designed many engines for successful Longtrack, Grasstrack and speedway riders.

Godden engineering
Don started his engineering company in the early 1970s designing frames and then engines. His GR 500 engine was used by many top riders and it soon became a championship winning engine.

United States rider Shawn Moran won the Longtrack World Championship with the Godden engine in 1983 and twelve months later at least half of the finalist's all used this same engine. The last of the Longtrack Championships came with Marcel Gerhard in 1992. In Speedway Hans Nielsen won three world titles using the Godden engine in 1986, 1987 and 1989.

Racing career

World Longtrack Championship

 1966  Mühldorf (5th) 7pts
 1967  Scheeßel (Second) 13pts
 1968  Mühldorf (Second) 16pts
 1969  Oslo (Champion) 14pts
 1970  Scheeßel (Second) 26pts
 1971  Oslo (7th) 10pts
 1972  Mühldorf (10th) 9pts
 1973  Oslo (4th) 19pts
 1974  Scheeßel (6th) 13pts
 1975  Gornja Radgona (8th) 11pts
 1976  Marianske Lazne (12th) 5pts
 1977 Did not compete
 1978  Mühldorf (14th) 8pts

European Grasstrack Championship
 1978  Hereford (Third) 23pts

British Grasstrack Championship Podiums
 1962  Evesham (Second)
 1964  Sleaford (Third)
 1965  Braintree (Champion)
 1967  Folkestone (Champion)
 1972  Burton Constable Hall (Champion)

References

1936 births
2011 deaths
People from Blackburn
People from Dartford
English motorcycle racers
Individual Speedway Long Track World Championship riders